The Ranger 29 is an American sailboat, that was designed by Gary Mull and first built in 1971.

The boat can be confused with the Philip Rhodes' 1960 Rhodes Ranger 29 design.

Production
The boat was built by Ranger Yachts in the United States from 1971 to 1975 and is now out of production.

The design was replaced in production by the Mull-designed Ranger 28.

Design
The Ranger 29 is a small recreational keelboat, built predominantly of fiberglass. It has a masthead sloop rig, an internally-mounted spade-type rudder mounted on a skeg and a fixed fin keel. It displaces  and carries  of lead ballast.

The boat has a PHRF racing average handicap of 186 with a high of 195 and low of 180.

See also
List of sailing boat types

References

Keelboats
1970s sailboat type designs
Sailing yachts
Sailboat type designs by Gary Mull
Sailboat types built by Ranger Yachts